is an arcade skateboard racing game developed by Amusement Vision and published by Sega for Sega Chihiro hardware in March 2004 following limited location tests in late 2003. The game was revealed at Tokyo's JAMMA Arcade Show in 2003. A spiritual successor to Top Skater, it was created by the same team that developed Jet Set Radio.

Plot
All throughout the world, a global hardcore downhill racing skate tournament competition known as the Ollie King makes its debut. With little rules, no limits on speed, and a lot of risk, contestants are challenged to thrash and skate their way down to the finish line in first place by skill and style. Taking place in three major metropolises, the sunny and hilly but winding iconic streets of Hyde and Lombard of San Francisco, California, USA, the steep, near abyssal and dark alleys of Picadilly Circus in London, United Kingdom, and the mountainous, high-flying, and floating but staggering downhill of Fushimi Castle and Fushimi Inari-taisha in Kyoto, Japan, these few courses make up for the event's limited hostings by Ollie King's extreme layouts and terrain that only invite the most skilled, daring, and gutsy of boarders to blaze through at the lead without a scratch. Six of these challengers- Phillip "Grinner" Jones, Tez Tanaka, Miguel Diaz, Didi Summers, Scott Ripper, and J.D. Bullet -may have what it takes to be crowned boarding's best as Ollie King.

Gameplay
Ollie King is played with an on cabinet skateboard like setup that mimics the experience of riding a skateboard. Through planting one's weight of their back foot on the board, the board can sink in, mimicking the action of a skateboarder squatting to ready their core to control their board before performing tricks or going down hill and maintaining a safe ride. Upon shifting one's weight to the front, this mimics the standard skateboard trick known as an ollie, allowing one to perform skateboard tricks in game or jump. Tilting the board left or right steers the player's character.

Gameplay consisted of the player picking from 1 of 6 characters, each with their own stats, competing in a series of downhill skateboarding, races with the primary goal of getting first place, where a total of 8 contestants compete in 3 locations; San Francisco, London, and Kyoto each with a difficulty rating of their own from 1 to 5 stars. The cabinet also had its own difficulty modes which altered tracks slightly, the difficulties are Kids Mode, Normal Mode, and Expert Mode.

Depicting extreme and aggressive in-line skateboarding with a racing twist, gameplay demands good reflexes with the board's controller and the in game events. Race tracks are designed akin to downhill snowboarding games like SSX, with rather a focus on skateboarding, and depicting larger and farther expanses than their real world counterparts, and maintaining a high speed with good control and being able to perform tricks is always a major priority to cross the distance. Half pipes, large grinding rails, and ramps from large to small are a staple of Ollie King's courses, encouraging players to perform tricks for style as well as speed, as tricks can accelerate players greater than normally riding through. The race challenge of Ollie King is kept through a checkpoint heat system, demanding competitors to clear that portion of the stage in a given allotted time, or else will be immediately disqualified. In a solo arcade run, the player character will have to deal with aggressive local skater gangs- from a gang of flamboyant leather clad biker-like boarders in San Francisco, a group of snobby and uptight upper class hipster boarders in London, and a zoku gang of ninja like tribal thrashers in Kyoto- demanding first place be won to be allowed to the next stage of Ollie King. Due to Ollie King being a coin operated arcade game, winning or losing, and at the discretion of the arcade operator's settings, demands payment to continue to the next stage.

If the player is not careful, they can wipe out; wipe outs are triggered by falling beyond a safe drop distance after a regular jump, crashing into pillars or walls at high speeds, and being greatly unbalanced during a rail grind. While the game doesn't have a health mechanic, it is similar to being out of bounds for an extended period of time or falling off the course in other competitive/kart racing games, which can stall the player and have them lose their place in the race to other racers, and issues penalties to the player's rank upon completing the race.

During the race contestants can perform tricks to gain points and are ranked with a letter system from lowest to highest: D, C, B, A, S, SS, and X. Rankings of tricks are highly dependent on conditions of performance, what kind of tricks are being done, and the player's reaction speed and timing; aerial tricks demand speed, a ramp, and a length of downhill and air space to perform, while grinding demands the player to balance on the rail properly by shifting the board controller into the safe balance zone as depicted with an in game meter during a grind, else the player can wipe out. Due to limits on how many track elements there are in a given stage, S to X aerial tricks are only performed with big ramps and large air space, instead encouraging the player to try to frequently perform as many high level tricks as they can with what they can come across as soon as possible. Upon scoring any position in a race the players receive a final score with two letter grades and a ranking the lowest being 'Raw Beginner' and the highest being 'Ollie King'.

The arcade cabinet supported multiplayer by linking the systems together to allow up to 4 players to compete.

Notes

References

External links
 Official website

2004 video games
Amusement Vision games
Arcade video games
Arcade-only video games
Multiplayer and single-player video games
Sega arcade games
Skateboarding video games
Smilebit games
Video games developed in Japan
Video games scored by Hideki Naganuma
Video games with cel-shaded animation